Tuckfield is a surname. Notable people with the surname include: 

Alexander Tuckfield (born 2004), Australian Paralympic swimmer
John Tuckfield (fl. 1550), English merchant and alderman
Roger Tuckfield (c. 1685–1739), British landowner and politician